The 2019 Archery World Cup, also known as the Hyundai Archery World Cup for sponsorship reasons, was the 14th edition of the international archery circuit organised annually by World Archery. The 2019 World Cup consisted of five events, and ran from 22 April to 7 September 2019.

Calendar
The calendar for the 2019 World Cup, announced by World Archery.

Results

Recurve

Men's individual

Women's individual

Men's team

Women's team

Mixed team

Compound

Men's individual

Women's individual

Men's team

Women's team

Mixed team

Medals table

References

External links
 World Archery website

Archery World Cup
World Cup
International archery competitions hosted by Colombia
2019 in Colombian sport
International archery competitions hosted by China
2019 in Chinese sport
International archery competitions hosted by Turkey
2019 in Turkish sport
International archery competitions hosted by Germany
2019 in German sport
International archery competitions hosted by Russia
2019 in Russian sport
April 2019 sports events in South America
May 2019 sports events in China
May 2019 sports events in Turkey
July 2019 sports events in Germany
September 2019 sports events in Russia